Stephen George Gammon (born 24 September 1939) is a Welsh former professional footballer. A Welsh under-23 international, Gammon's spent seven years with Cardiff City before a broken leg ended his professional career in 1965.

Career

Gammon was born in Swansea, but began his career at Cardiff City, after being spotted playing for Mumbles Boys Club at the age of sixteen. He was handed a professional contract on his seventeenth birthday, making his debut, alongside fellow debutant Derek Tapscott, soon after in a 4–1 victory over Grimsby Town in September 1958 and his performances earned him a call up to the Wales under-23 side. The following season he scored his first, and only, goal for Cardiff in a 4–4 draw with Stoke City and helped the club gain promotion to Division One.

In February 1961, he suffered a major fracture in his leg after colliding with Denis Law during a league match against Manchester City. He attempted several comebacks after the injury but broke the same leg twice in the following three seasons and subsequently dropped out of professional football, joining Southern Football League side Kettering Town where he took over as manager of the side three months after his arrival. Gammon went on to make over 300 appearances in all competitions for Kettering. He left the club in December 1971, stepping down as manager after six years at Rockingham Road, being replaced by Ron Atkinson.

References

1939 births
Living people
Footballers from Swansea
Welsh footballers
Welsh football managers
Wales under-23 international footballers
Cardiff City F.C. players
Kettering Town F.C. players
English Football League players
Kettering Town F.C. managers
Association football midfielders